Eamon Hamilton is frontman of Brakes and formerly played keyboards for  Sea Power.



Biography

Eamon Peter Hamilton is the singer and songwriter for the band Brakes, born on 20 August 1975 in Stewart, BC, Canada and raised in Stroud, Gloucestershire, UK.

Hamilton moved to Brighton in 2000 and in 2002 was recruited to play keyboards for British Sea Power live. The band were reportedly impressed that—without warning and during a song without keyboards— Hamilton went off into the crowd banging a drum. Due to touring commitments with Brakes, Hamilton left British Sea Power in January 2006.

Hamilton has recorded and played live under a number of different guises. One of his main projects was Brighter Lunch, also featuring Matt Eaton, now of Actress Hands.

In August 2002, Tom and Alex White of The Electric Soft Parade saw Hamilton performing solo and offered to play guitar and drums, respectively, with him. They were joined by Marc Beatty, of Mockin' Bird Studios and The Tenderfoot, to play bass. Brakes was born. Their debut single, Pick Up the Phone, was released in 2004 on Tugboat Records and an album, Give Blood, followed in July 2005. In October 2006 they released their second album The Beatific Visions. They released their third album Touchdown in 2009.

On 1 September 2008, Hamilton married the American author Koren Zailckas in Romainville near Paris.

Selected discography

Brighter Lunch
"Going My Way" – 2001, self-financed
"Call A Medic" – 8 October 2001 on Monkey Tennis

Brakes

Albums
Give Blood – 4 July 2005 on Rough Trade Records
The Beatific Visions – October 2006
Touchdown – 20 April 2009 on Fat Cat Records

Singles and EPs
"Pick Up the Phone" – 20 September 2005 on Tugboat Records
"All Night Disco Party" – 13 June 2005 on Rough Trade Records
"Ring A Ding Ding" – 17 October 2005 on Rough Trade Records
"Hold Me in the River" – 4 December 2006 on Rough Trade Records
"Cease And Desist" – 26 February 2007
"Beatific Visions" – 20 August 2007

References

External links
Sea Power official website
Eamon reviewing his future band prior to joining

Date of birth missing (living people)
Living people
Canadian singer-songwriters
Canadian indie rock musicians
People from the Regional District of Kitimat–Stikine
Musicians from Gloucestershire
British Sea Power members
Musicians from Brighton and Hove
Brakes (band) members
Year of birth missing (living people)